Trần Thành (born 2 February 1997) is a Vietnamese footballer who plays as a forward  for V.League 2 club Quảng Nam.

International career 
On 23 October 2016, he scored the only goal to help Vietnam U19 beat Bahrain in the quarter-finals of the 2016 AFC U-19 Championship to enter the semi-finals of the continental tournament. Also earning tickets to the 2017 FIFA U-20 World Cup in South Korea. This is also the first time a team of 11 football player of Vietnam participated in a World Cup tournament of FIFA.

International goals

U-19

References

Living people
Vietnamese footballers
Association football forwards
V.League 1 players
1997 births
People from Thừa Thiên-Huế province